Liangzhe Circuit (997–1160s) was one of the major circuits during the Song dynasty (960–1279). Its administrative area corresponds roughly to modern Zhejiang, Shanghai, and southern Jiangsu (the portion east of Changzhou, between Lake Tai and the Yangtze). The fertile Yangtze River Delta lay within Liangzhe Circuit, as did Lake Tai. Liangzhe was the wealthiest circuit in Song.

The capital of Liangzhe Circuit was Hang Prefecture (renamed Lin'an Prefecture in 1129, when it became the Song capital).

History
Liangzhe Circuit was created in 997, about 19 years after the Wuyue (907–978) king Qian Chu surrendered his kingdom to the Song dynasty. The name Liangzhe (兩浙; "Two Zhe's") had been in use to refer to the two Tang dynasty (618–907) circuits Zhejiang East Circuit and Zhejiang West Circuit, both created in 758 and later controlled by Wuyue. Liangzhe Circuit was not identical to Wuyue territory: it included former Southern Tang prefectures like Chang Prefecture and Run Prefecture, but not Fu Prefecture.

In 1074, Liangzhe Circuit was divided into 2 circuits: Liangzhe East Circuit and Liangzhe West Circuit, but quickly recombined. After another brief split between 1076 and 1077, Liangzhe Circuit was permanently split in two in the 1160s. (In 1127, following the Jingkang incident, Zhao Gou (Emperor Gaozong) reestablished the Song dynasty in Hang Prefecture, which he renamed to Lin'an Prefecture in 1129.)

References

 

Circuits of the Song dynasty
997 establishments
10th-century establishments in China
History of Zhejiang
History of Shanghai
History of Jiangsu